Cobb Theatres was an American cinema chain based in Birmingham, Alabama. The company was established in 1921, in Fayette, Alabama, expanding through the South starting in the late 1940s, and buying out General Cinema's West Central Florida theatres and Wometco Theatres in the 1990s before being bought by Regal Cinemas in 1997 and revived in 2001. Cobb operated 25 locations, the majority of which were located in Florida, with others in Alabama, Georgia, Ohio, North Carolina, and Virginia.

History

In 1921, Jefferson A. Richards opened his family's first movie theatre in Fayette, Alabama. Lucille Richards Cobb purchased the theatre from Jefferson in 1934. In 1947, Rowland C. Cobb bought Lucille's two theatres and started building indoor and drive-in theatres throughout northern Alabama.

Notable theatres opened by Cobb included the Thunderbird Drive-In in Atlanta (the South's largest and most modern drive-in theatre) in 1963, the United States' first four-plex theatre in 1971, Cinema City 8 at Birmingham's Roebuck Shopping Center (the largest eight-plex theatre in the US) in 1978, and Sawgrass 18 (promoted as the largest theatre east of the Rocky Mountains) in 1991. Cobb operated 27 theatres by 1965. The following year, Cobb purchased eight theatres in Birmingham, Alabama and moved the company's offices to Birmingham.

Cobb Theatres expanded into South Florida by purchasing General Cinema's theatres in West Central Florida in 1992 and Wometco Theatres in 1994 (forming Cobb Theatres II following the Wometco acquisition), bringing Cobb's screen total to 315. Robert M. Cobb succeeded Rowland as the company's CEO on December 1, 1995. On June 11, 1997, it was announced that Regal Cinemas would acquire Cobb Theatres, which had 643 screens at 67 theatres, for $200 million plus $100 million in debt; Regal completed the acquisition on July 31.

Robert M. Cobb decided to re-enter the cinema industry by forming Cobb Theatres III in 2000. Cobb opened the Dolphin 19 theatre in Miami, Florida on May 25, 2001, attracting 1.4 million visitors. Cobb grew to 11 theatres with 166 screens by 2006. In 2008, Cobb introduced CinéBistro, an elevated premium dinner-and-a-movie concept, in Miami and Tampa. Cobb expanded into Colorado, Virginia and Georgia by 2011, growing to 21 theatres with 253 screens.

In October 2017, Cobb Theatres was acquired by Mexican cinema chain Cinemex; its locations were brought under its U.S. banner CMX.

See also
 Death of Chad Oulson

References

Companies based in Birmingham, Alabama
Economy of the Southeastern United States
Former cinemas in the United States
Movie theatre chains in the United States
Wometco Enterprises
Regal Entertainment Group
American companies established in 1921
American companies disestablished in 1997
American companies disestablished in 2017